Atayev, Atayew, Ataew or Ataev (masculine; Russian: Атаев) and Atayeva, Atayewa, Ataewa or Ataeva (feminine; Russian: Атaевa) is the surname of the following people: 
Ahmet Ataýew (born 1990), Turkmen football midfielder
Aksoltan Ataýewa (born 1944), Turkmen diplomat
Almas Atayev (born 1981), Kazakh judoka
Artem Atayev (born 1938), Russian physicist
Bozigit Ataev (born 1979), Russian mixed martial artist
Fakhraddin Atayev (born 1972), Azerbaijani conductor
Galina Atayeva (born 1971), Turkmen judoka
Gurbanmyrat Ataýew (born 1965), Oil and Gas Minister in the Government of Turkmenistan
Döwletmyrat Ataýew (born 1983), Turkmen player
Merdan Ataýew (born 1995), Turkmen swimmer
Muslim Atayev (1973–2005), Chechen Islamist
Nariman Atayev (born 1971), Uzbek boxer 
Öwezgeldi Ataýew (born 1951), Turkmen politician
Sabira Ataeva (1917–1993), Turkmen actress
Serdaraly Ataýew (born 1984), Turkmen football player
Süleýman Ataýew (born 1996), Turkmen swimmer